Chris Gantry (born December 29, 1942) is an American country musician and songwriter known for his involvement in the outlaw country genre. Gantry is known for writing songs such as "Dreams of the Everyday Housewife."

Discography

Studio albums 

 Introspection (1968)
 Motor Mouth (1970)
 Gantry Rides Again (2015)
 At the House of Cash (recorded in 1973 and 1974, released in 2017)
 Nashlantis (2019)

Live albums 

 Live at the Filming Station (2014)

References 

Living people
1942 births
American country singer-songwriters